The chief minister of Odisha, an Indian state, is the head of the Government of Odisha. As per the Constitution of India, the governor is the state's de jure head, but de facto executive authority rests with the chief minister. Following elections to the Odisha Legislative Assembly, the governor usually invites the party (or coalition) with a majority of seats to form the government. The governor appoints the chief minister, whose council of ministers are collectively responsible to the assembly. Given that he has the confidence of the assembly, the chief minister's term is for five years and is subject to no term limits.

On 1 April 1936, Orissa Province was formed. The province has been controlled by the King of Paralakhemundi, Maharaja Krishna Chandra Gajapati Narayan Deo. He ruled until July, 1937. Thereafter the All India Congress party leader Bishwanath Das took charge for two more years. Again the King took the control before he finally handed over to Dr. Harekrushna Mahatab in the year 1946. After India got its freedom and constitution was enacted, the state started working in the principles of democracy. Until the first election, Dr. Harekrushna Mahatab continued to be the chief minister of Odisha and then it was taken over by Nabakrushna Choudhury. Here is the list of chief ministers of Odisha since 1946. Since 1946, Odisha has had 14 chief ministers. Serving since 2000, Naveen Patnaik of the Biju Janata Dal is the incumbent chief minister, and the longest-serving one in Odisha's history.

Premiers/prime ministers of Orissa

Chief ministers of Odisha

See also

 History of Odisha
 Elections in Odisha
 List of governors of Odisha
 Odisha Legislative Assembly
 List of current Indian chief ministers
 List of deputy chief ministers of Odisha

Notes

References

External links 
  Official Website of the Office of the Chief Minister

Odisha
Chief Ministers of Odisha
People from Odisha
Odisha-related lists